Hansol Jung is a South Korean translator and playwright. Jung is a recipient the Whiting Award in drama and three of her plays were listed on the 2015 Kilroys' List. Jung is a member of the Ma-Yi Theater Writers' Lab and was a Hodder Fellow at Princeton University. In addition to writing several plays, Jung has also written for the television series Tales Of the City.

Biography 
At age six, Jung and her family moved to apartheid-era South Africa. At age 13, Jung and her family returned to South Korea. At age 20, Jung studied abroad as an exchange student at New York University; three years later, she moved to the United States. Jung began an MFA in musical theatre directing at Pennsylvania State University, before transferring to receive an MFA in playwriting from the Yale School of Drama. Jung graduated from Yale in 2014.

Career

Theatre 
Jung has translated over thirty English-language musicals into Korean, including Spamalot, Dracula, The 25th Annual Putnam County Spelling Bee, and Evita. She has also worked as a theatre director and lyricist in South Korea.

In 2015, Jung participated in a residency at the Eugene O'Neill Theater Center's National Playwrights Conference, where she developed her play Cardboard Piano. That year, Jung was one of three playwrights to be selected for the New York Theatre Workshop's 2050 Fellowship. Jung was the 2016 Playwriting Fellow at Page 73 Theatre. While working at Page 73, Jung developed three plays: Wolf Play, Wild Goose Dreams, and an untitled play about drugs. Jung is also a member of the Ma-Yi Theater Writers' Lab.

Jung's plays Cardboard Piano, No More Sad Things, and Wolf Play were all listed on the 2015 Kilroys' List, which recognizes excellence in un-produced or rarely produced works by women, transgender, and non-binary playwrights. Jung was the playwright with the most plays on the list that year. Wild Goose Dreams was listed on the 2016 Kilroys' List.

For the 2019/20 academic year at the Lewis Center for the Arts at Princeton University, Jung was one of five Mary Mackall Gwinn Hodder Fellows and the only playwright of the five artists. During the Hodder Fellowship, Jung worked on her audio-feed play Window House. In 2020, Jung was commissioned by Alliance Theatre to write an adaptation of Shakespeare's Romeo and Juliet as part of their Classic Remix Project. A reading of this adaptation occurred online with Two River Theatre in 2020. In April 2023, the adaptation is to be staged at Two River.

Jung participated in the 24 Hour Plays project in March 2020 during the COVID-19 lockdown. Jung wrote the monologue "Cocktail Class" which was then performed by Ashlie Atkinson. A year later, the Jung wrote a second play for the project to celebrate the one-year anniversary. Jung was commissioned to create work for Woolly Mammoth Theatre Company and the Telephonic Literary Union's telephone theatrical event, Human Resources.

In 2022, New York's Tripwire Harlot Press announced they would be releasing a collected edition of some of Jung's works as part of their "Sledgehammer Series," which aims to publish more plays by writers of colour. Jung's volume is titled Doodles from the Margins: Three Plays and will feature Wolf Play, No More Sad Things, and Wild Goose Dreams and will include doodles and notes from Jung in the margins.

Television 
Jung was part of the entirely LGBT writing staff of the 2019 Netflix miniseries Tales Of The City. Jung wrote the series' third episode, "Happy, Now?". In 2021, Jung was selected to be a participant in the Writers Guild of America, East's first Showrunner Academy program. She was also a writer for the 2022 Apple TV+ show, Pachinko. Jung is writing a television adaptation of C Pam Zhang's novel How Much of These Hills is Gold.

Plays

Among the Dead 

Among the Dead was the first play Jung wrote, which she also used to apply for the Yale School of Drama. The plot of the play spans a total of 30 years and explores legacy, impact, and experiences of the Korean 'comfort women' of World War II. Among the Dead premiered at HERE with the Ma-Yi Theatre Company in November 2016.

Cardboard Piano 

Cardboard Piano is a two-act play set in Uganda. The first act takes place on the eve of the new millennium when two teenage girls, one American and one Ugandan, perform a makeshift wedding only to be interrupted by a child soldier. The second act takes place on their 'wedding' anniversary in 2014 and follows the American as she returns to Uganda. Cardboard Piano premiered the 2016 Humana Festival of New American Plays at the Actors Theatre of Louisville in Louisville, Kentucky. The premiere was directed by Leigh Silverman.

No More Sad Things 
No More Sad Things follows a 42-year-old tourist in Maui who becomes romantically involved with a 15 year old. No More Sad Things co-premiered in November 2015 at Sideshow Theatre in Chicago, Illinois and Boise Contemporary Theatre in Boise, Idaho. Hansol Jung's brother, Jongbin, co-wrote music for the play with Hansol.

Wild Goose Dreams 
Wild Goose Dreams is a love story between a North Korean defector, Nanhee, and Minsung, a South Korean Goose-father, who meet online. Jung wrote the first thirty pages in Korean before translating them into English. Wild Goose Dreams premiered in 2017 at La Jolla Playhouse in San Diego under the direction of Leigh Silverman.

Wolf Play 
Wolf Play is about a Korean boy who is adopted in American and is "re-homed" after the original adoptive parents have a biological baby. He is then "second-chance-adopted" by a lesbian couple. In the play, the boy, Jeenu, believes himself to be a wolf but is really a puppet. Jung was inspired to write Wolf Play after reading a news article about Facebook and Yahoo groups used by some adoptive parents to re-home their adopted children, usually from other countries. Wolf Play premiered in March 2019 at the Artists Repertory Theatre in Portland, Oregon.

Filmography

Television 
Writer:

 Tales of the City (2019)
 Pachinko (2022)

Awards

References

External links 

 

South Korean dramatists and playwrights
South Korean LGBT screenwriters
South Korean LGBT dramatists and playwrights
21st-century South Korean women writers
Yale School of Drama alumni
Women television writers
Princeton University fellows
South Korean translators
English–Korean translators
21st-century translators
LGBT women
Date of birth missing (living people)
Place of birth missing (living people)
Living people
21st-century screenwriters
Year of birth missing (living people)
American LGBT people of Asian descent